Old Traditions, New Standards is the debut album from the Washington-based indiepop band Tullycraft. In 2022, Old Traditions, New Standards was included on Pitchforks list of The 25 Best Indie Pop Albums of the '90s. 

The album was produced by Pat Maley. Tracks were recorded at Avast Studios in Seattle and mixed at Yoyo Studios in Olympia. The album was originally released on Harriet Records out of Cambridge, Massachusetts. Robynn Iwata from the band cub provided guest vocals on the song "Josie," and Chris Munford from the band Incredible Force of Junior provided guest vocals on the song "Mental Obsession." 

The album reached #22 on the CMJ Top 200 chart. The song "Pop Songs Your New Boyfriend's Too Stupid to Know About"  was listed as essential listening in Pitchfork Media's 2005 article on Twee Pop entitled "Twee as Fuck."

Track listing
"Willie Goes to the Seashore"
"Josie"
"Mental Obsession"
"Wish I'd Kept a Scrapbook"
"Superboy & Supergirl"
"Sweet"
"Dollywood"
"Pop Songs Your New Boyfriend's Too Stupid to Know About"
"Then Again, Maybe I Don't"
"Meet Me in Las Vegas"
"Cammy & The Count"
"Miracles Are Hard to Find"

Notes
 The German LP featured two extra songs not found on the US version: "Pitney Bose" and "Guyana Punch"

Television
 In 2018 the song "Superboy & Supergirl" was featured in the first episode of the Netflix series The End of the F***ing World, based on the graphic novel The End of the Fucking World by Charles S. Forsman.

Personnel
 Sean Tollefson – vocals, bass
 Jeff Fell – drums
 Gary Miklusek – guitar, backing vocals
 Pat Maley – production, audio engineering
 Aaron Gorseth – production assistance
 Robynn Iwata – vocals on "Josie"
 Chris Munford – vocals on "Mental Obsession"
 Susan Robb – vocals on "Then Again, Maybe I Don't"

Controversy
In 2007 the song "Sweet" was used in a television commercial for the hot-dog chain Wienerschnitzel. The song was licensed without the band's knowledge or permission. The licensing was handled by Darla, the California-based record label that had reissued the album Old Traditions, New Standards. Needless to say, the band was upset when they learned of the commercial, and a dispute between Tullycraft and Darla ensued.

References

 Strong, M. C. (2003). The Great Indie Discography (2nd Edition) pg. 1041. Published by Canon Books Ltd. (US/CAN) .
 Parsons, J.R. . Pop Songs.... Retrieved on November 14, 2008.
 Johnston, M. . The Case Of The Wienerschnitzel Song. Retrieved on November 14, 2008.

Tullycraft albums
1996 debut albums